This is a list of Kazakh football transfers in the summer transfer window 2015 by club. Only clubs of the 2015 Kazakhstan Premier League are included.

Kazakhstan Premier League 2015

Aktobe

In:

Out:

Astana

In:

Out:

Atyrau

In:

Out:

Irtysh

In:

Out:

Kairat

In:

Out:

Kaisar

In:

Out:

Okzhetpes

In:

Out:

Ordabasy

In:

Out:

Shakhter Karagandy

In:

Out:

Taraz

In:

Out:

Tobol

In:

Out:

Zhetysu

In:

Out:

References

Kazakhstan
2015 summer
Transfers